The Panama flycatcher (Myiarchus panamensis) is a species of bird in the family Tyrannidae. It is found in Colombia, Costa Rica, Panama, and Venezuela. Its natural habitats are subtropical or tropical dry forest, subtropical or tropical moist lowland forest, subtropical or tropical mangrove forest, subtropical or tropical dry shrubland, and heavily degraded former forest.

References

Myiarchus
Birds of Panama
Birds described in 1860
Taxonomy articles created by Polbot